Kwasi Anin-Yeboah  (born 24 May 1953) is a Ghanaian judge and the current Chief Justice of Ghana. In December 2019, President Nana Addo Dankwa Akufo-Addo nominated Justice Anin-Yeboah as the Chief Justice of Ghana.

Early life and education 
Anin Yeboah was born in Toase in the Ashanti Region of Ghana on 24 May 1953. He attended Amaniampong Secondary School and Apam Secondary School  and then moved to the University of Ghana and the Ghana School of Law where he graduated in 1981.

Legal career in Ghana 

After graduating from law school he served as an Assistant state Attorney at the Attorney General Office Koforidua. He proceeded to work as a partner at Afisem chambers at its koforidua Branch. He was later elected as the Eastern Regional Bar President. He served as a Justice of the Court of Appeal (2003-2008) and the High Court (2002-2003) in Ghana. Justice Anin Yeboah has also provided his legal experience to football in his country, serving as Chairman of the Appeal Committee at the Ghana Football Association from 2004 to 2008. He is currently the chairman of the Legal Aid Board and Chairman of the Disciplinary Committee of The General Legal Council of Ghana. Anin-Yeboah was appointed to the Supreme Court of Ghana by President John Kufuor in June 2008. Justice Anin Yeboah is currently the fourth longest-serving Justice of the Supreme Court.

Appointment as chief justice 
In December 2019, President Nana Addo Dankwa Akufo-Addo nominated Justice Anin-Yeboah to replace Sophia Akuffo as Chief Justice of the Supreme Court of Ghana. His vetting was opposed by the Executive Director for the Alliance for Social Equity and Public Accountability (ASEPA), Mensah Thompson who wanted Parliament to put on hold, the vetting of Justice Anin Yeboah to allow for CHRAJ to complete investigations on a petition against the nominee.  Mr. Mensah had alleged that Justice Anin Yeboah has not disclosed his assets and liabilities as required by law. The following was the findings and decisions of CHRAJ with respect to the non-declaration of asset as raised by Mr. Mensah.

Findings

At the end of the preliminary investigations the commission finds as a fact that the respondent has complied with article 286 of the constitution by declaring his assets and liabilities to the auditor general.

Decision

Having found out that the respondent had declared his assets and liabilities at the time the allegations were made and having satisfied the conditions for holding that office then, albeit a late submission, what should be the appropriate action that the commissioner should take in respect of the results of the investigation?

The commission is of the considered view that having found that the respondent has complied with article 286, the appropriate action in the circumstances would be to dismiss the compliant as overtaking, unsubstantiated and not made out. The compliant is accordingly dismissed.

Anin Yeboah whose appointment by Akuffo-Addo was in consultation with the Council of State as stipulated by the Constitution of Ghana was approved as the Chief Justice of the Republic of Ghana by the Parliament of Ghana after vetting in December 2019. He is the first male Chief Justice in 12 years.

Justice Anin Yeboah was sworn in as the 14th Chief Justice of the Supreme Court of Ghana on 7 January 2020.

2020 election petition hearing 
The Supreme Court led by the Chief Justice Kwasi Anin-Yeboah dismissed the election petition which sort for a re-run of the 2020 election by the Petitioner, John Dramani Mahama who is the presidential candidate of NDC.

John Mahama was challenging the election on the basis that his contender Nana Akufo-Addo and the other eight presidential candidates did not attain the mandatory 50%+1 vote constitutional threshold to be declared the winner of the polls.

Contribution to academia 
In addition to his work as a Justice of the Supreme Court he also serves as a Part-Time lecturer at the Ghana School of Law where he teaches Civil procedure and Ghana Legal System. Justice Anin-Yeboah's Legal experience includes writing judgement in constitutional matters, civil and criminal cases. He also provides opinions on legal matters in the West African nation.

International assignments 

FIFA is an international soccer's governing body and organizer of global tournaments including the World up. It was founded in 1904. It has a membership of 211. The following are some positions he occupied in the international arena.

 He rose to become a member of the adjudicatory chamber of FIFA and he was subsequently appointed in May 2017, as Chairman of the Disciplinary Committee of the 67th FIFA Congress in Bahrain 
 Chairman of the FIFA Ethics Committee, a body primarily responsible for investigating possible infringements of the FIFA Code of Ethics.
 He is also the current Chairman of the Legal aid board.
Anin Yeboah has also served in the Confederation of African Football (CAF) 
In September 2019, he was named onto the CAF/FIFA Reform Implementation Taskforce team for African football.

See also
Chief Justice of Ghana
 List of judges of the Supreme Court of Ghana
 Supreme Court of Ghana

References 

1953 births
Living people
Akan people
Chief justices of Ghana
Ghana School of Law alumni
Academic staff of Ghana School of Law
Justices of the Supreme Court of Ghana
People from Ashanti Region
People from Eastern Region (Ghana)
People from Koforidua
University of Ghana alumni